Člunek is a municipality and village in Jindřichův Hradec District in the South Bohemian Region of the Czech Republic. It has about 500 inhabitants.

Administrative parts
Villages of Kunějov and Lomy are administrative parts of Člunek.

References

Villages in Jindřichův Hradec District